BS20 may refer to:
BS20, a BS postcode area for Bristol, England
Bonomi BS.20 Albanella, a sailplane
BS 20 Report on BS Screw Threads, a British Standard

Bernardo Silva, professional footballer referred to by his initials and kit number